Karel Janeček (born 26 July 1973) is a Czech mathematician, entrepreneur, anti-corruption campaigner, creator of the D21 – Janeček method voting system and the online game Prezident 21.

Early life and education
Janeček was born in Plzeň. He graduated from the Faculty of Mathematics and Physics of Charles University in Prague in the field of probability and mathematical statistics. He is an MBA in finance graduate of Bradley University, Peoria, Illinois, US, and a PhD graduate in the field of mathematical finance of Carnegie Mellon University in Pittsburgh, Pennsylvania, US.

Academia
From 2007 to 2013, Janeček lectured at the Faculty of Mathematics and Physics of Charles University in Prague. He specializes in optimal control in mathematical finance.

Janeček has authored and co-authored several research articles in scientific journals in the area of applied stochastic calculus, where his work has numerous citations, such as "Optimal investment with high-watermark performance fee," SIAM Journal on Control and Optimization, 2012; "Futures trading with transaction costs," Illinois Journal of Mathematics, 2010; "Asymptotic analysis for optimal investment and consumption with transaction costs," Finance and Stochastics, 2004; and others.

Business
From 1998 to 2000, Janeček worked as a mathematical analyst for the hedge fund Market Research Ltd, and from 2004 to 2005, served as Researcher in the Austrian Academy of Sciences. On the basis of his experience, he started the firm RSJ Algorithmic Trading.

Anti-corruption campaign

According to media reports, by 2013, the Czech government was "buffeted" by a series of corruption scandals that have threatened to bring it down. After Václav Klaus, then president of the republic, in his last days in office, granted amnesty to a number of people accused of corruption, Janeček financed the publishing of online videos and newspaper advertisements urging Czechs to sign a petition calling Klaus to account. The signatures were published on a website called "High Treason" in Czech. The movement convinced 28 Senators to back a proposal in the Senate for the Constitutional Court of the Czech Republic to undertake high treason proceedings against Klaus.

Klaus, who was eventually not charged by the Supreme Court, had previously stated he did not regret the amnesty, and on an official visit to Slovakia dismissed the move as "political games."

Political reform
In 2012, he proposed a new electoral system primarily based on a minus vote, i.e. the possibility to vote against a candidate. The idea was promoted as a part of the Positive Evolution project. In May 2013, Janecek created the electoral system D21 – Janeček method which, he argues, will bring about a major improvement comparable to "an upgrade from DOS to Windows". The main effect of D21 lies in the use of multiple votes - each voter has twice as many votes than the number of seats available to winners. More concretely, for the elections to the Chamber of Deputies, he designed two-mandate districts in which voters could use four votes, with the possibility to use one minus vote. One of the biggest projects where the D21 – Janeček method was used took place in 2016 in the city of New York. It was the largest participatory budgeting project in North America. In this project people were asked to distribute $38 million among various different projects proposed by the members of the community to improve the life in the city. 28 out of the 51 districts were involved in this voting and around 67,000 voters participated.

Sponsorship
The Karel Janeček Benevolent Fund for Support of Science and Research was established in 2010 (renamed as Neuron Fund for Support of Science in 2013) a non-profit organisation, which promotes the idea of benefactors supporting the science and research in the Czech Republic. Neuron has supported a number of scientists and their projects through grants worth over 13 million Czech crowns.

Gambling

Janeček, in the 1990s, and after playing the game in various casinos in the United States and elsewhere, created a simulation software for advantage play in Blackjack, which he marketed under the brand "Statistical Blackjack Analyzer." The sim program has been praised by many gambling researchers. He has acted as a consultant for the casino games industry, including the creators of Blackjack Switch, which, before it became operational, was tested by Janeček-created software.

Janeček, along with Brett Harris, Mike Canjar, Winston Yamashita, Pete Moss, Kim Lee, and other gambling theorists, contributed to the development of what has become known as "optimal betting theory", and the discovery that it is possible to calculate a true count for unbalanced counting systems in casino Blackjack.  He has regularly contributed articles in gambling-research websites, such as Stanford Wong's BJ21.com.

Janeček recommends treating the handling of advantage play "as just another investment".

Presidential bid
On 21 January 2022, Janeček announced that he would be running in the 2023 Czech presidential election. He submitted 73,000 signatures, but this total was reduced following sample analysis to 48,000 (later the court labeled some of them as valid but he still failed to meet the criteria by 80 signatures), below the requirement. Janeček submitted a complaint to the Supreme Administrative Court. His complaint was rejected by the court on 13 December 2022. Janeček subsequently endorsed Petr Pavel in both rounds. On 3 February 2023 he submitted a complaint to the Supreme Administrative Court over the presidential election process.

Personal life
Janeček has two daughters from his first marriage to Michaelou, and a son from his second marriage to Mariem. Since May 2017, he has been in a relationship with Lilia Khousnoutdinova, and they have a daughter and a son. They got married first in a Buddhist wedding ceremony in Bhutan in 2017 and officially on 21 December 2021 in Prague.

See also
Kelly criterion
Edward O. Thorp
Claude Shannon
Black–Scholes model

References

External links
Personal blog (in Czech)
"Anti-corruption campaigner ‘targeted’ by Prague underworld", Česká Pozice, 31 January 2012

1973 births
Living people
People from Plzeň
Czech businesspeople
Czech mathematicians
Charles University alumni
Bradley University alumni
Czech billionaires
Candidates in the 2023 Czech presidential election